Elaphrus smaragdiceps is a species of ground beetle in the subfamily Elaphrinae. It was described by Semenov in 1889.

References

Elaphrinae
Beetles described in 1889